Roy Brooks may refer to:

 Roy Brooks (1901–1976), American actor
 Roy Brooks (1938–2005), American Jazz drummer